Bharata Khanda (IAST : Bhāratakhaṇḍa) is a term used in Hindu texts, including the Vedas, Mahabharata, Ramayana and the Puranic, to describe the Indian subcontinent. The historical context of the Sanskrit epics are the Vedic period (c. 1700–600 BCE), Mahajanapadas (c. 600s BCE) and the subsequent formation of the Maurya Empire (c. 300s BCE) and Gupta Empire (c. 300s CE) also with the beginning of the "golden age" of Classical Sanskrit literature.

Etymology 

In Hindu scriptures, Bharata Khanda is the habitable world; the known land as experienced by the writers. It is named after the legendary emperor Bharata and was first used in the Early Vedic Period (c. 1750–1100 BCE).

See also
Bharatavarsha
Avestan geography

References